Beacon high schools in Beijing is a system used by the municipal government of Beijing, China to designate model high schools.

Traditionally, some high schools in China have been statically designated as "key  schools", which are associated with academic prestige and preferential resource allocation.

Over the last decade, the municipality is in the process of changing it into a beacon high school (示范高中) system, which is subject to specific criterion and periodic reviews.  The long-term goal is to establish about 60 "large in scale, well-equipped and high quality" high schools, as examples of excellence.

To date, 3 reviews have been done, and 44 schools are currently listed as "beacon" high schools.

See also
Magnet school

High schools in Beijing